Mahua is a block and sub-division in Vaishali district, it is a small town between Hajipur to Muzaffarpur, Mahua is also a constituent assembly under Bihar Legislative Assembly. It comes under Hajipur Lok Sabha (Lower house of Indian Parliament) constituency

Population and communities
Male Population : 113240  (2009 ist.)
female Population : 105104
Total Population : 218344 
SC Total Population : 48231 
ST Total Population : 3
Minority Total Population : 23924  
Population Density : 1559  
Sex Ratio : 928

Gallery

See also
 List of villages in Mahua block

References 

Community development blocks in Vaishali district